Huddy is a surname. Notable people with the surname include:

Charlie Huddy, Canadian ice hockey player and coach
Jay Kristopher Huddy, American artist, filmmaker, and video game designer
Joshua Huddy
Juliet Huddy (born 1969), American talk show host and radio broadcaster
Leonie Huddy, Australian political scientist
Ryan Huddy (born 1983), Canadian ice hockey player
Xenophon Huddy, American lawyer